, also known as Case Closed: The Scarlet Bullet, is a 2021 Japanese animated mystery film directed by Chika Nagaoka. It is the twenty-fourth installment of the Case Closed film series based on the manga series of the same name by Gosho Aoyama, following the 2019 film Detective Conan: The Fist of Blue Sapphire. This is the first Reiwa-era Case Closed movie.

Detective Conan: The Scarlet Bullet was released in Japan on April 16, 2021. Its release was delayed from an original April 2020 date due to the COVID-19 pandemic. A global release was announced on February 9, 2021 featuring a multi-language trailer in Japanese, English, Korean, German, and Chinese. The Scarlet Bullet is listed as 2021's second highest-grossing Japanese film worldwide, below Jujutsu Kaisen 0.

Plot 
Japan is preparing to commemorate the World Sports Games (WSG), the world's biggest sports games, hosting them in Tokyo. The Hyperlinear bullet train, the pinnacle of Japan's advanced technology, will begin operation to coincide with the WSG's opening ceremony, running at speeds of up to 1,000 km/h between Shin-Nagoya Station and Tokyo's newly built Shibahama Station. As the world watches, disaster suddenly strikes the host venue, where the sponsors of the Games are gathered. A crisis unfolds as several industry leaders are kidnapped in quick succession. In the shadows, Shuichi Akai waits, watching the crisis unfold, as FBI agents await his orders. Conan deduces the connection between the terrible WSG-related kidnappings that occurred in Boston, 15 years earlier, and it is revealed the investigation was handled by the FBI back then.

Cast

Release 
Detective Conan: The Scarlet Bullet was released in several territories on opening day, including Hong Kong SAR, Korea, Singapore, Philippines, Brunei, Thailand, Vietnam, Germany, Switzerland, Liechtenstein, United Arab Emirates, Oman, Kuwait, Bahrain, Qatar, Saudi Arabia, Spain, and Macao.

The film was later released in other territories such as Australia, Indonesia, Malaysia, Thailand, Vietnam, France, Mainland China, New Zealand and Luxembourg.

Due to the poor performance of previous movies outside the Catalan region of Spain, this movie was not dubbed in Spanish at release, instead being played in Spanish theaters with only the subtitled Japanese dub and the Catalan dub.

The English dub of the film produced by Bang Zoom! Entertainment was scheduled to debut in the United States at Anime NYC on November 21, 2021, but was canceled.

Reception

Box office
Detective Conan: The Scarlet Bullet has earned a total of  globally. It is 2021's second highest-grossing Japanese film worldwide, below Jujutsu Kaisen 0.

Domestic
In Japan, the film sold 1,533,054 tickets in its first 3 days and earned ¥2,218,130,800 ($20.5 million), eclipsing the revenue of the previous film by 144% on first day sales alone. It ranked #1 at the Japanese box office, beating out Evangelion: 3.0+1.0 Thrice Upon a Time and by 15th Weekend, film earned overall gross of 7,479,317,860 yen (about US$67.86 million). The film opened with the third highest IMAX opening ever in Japan, grossing $1.2 million.

Foreign

Reviews
The variety content website Excite, highlighted the film as positive, marking the development of the character of Shuichi Akai and his relationship with Conan, calling the relationship between the two as "trustful". The review also labelled the movie as "flashy" and highlighted the importance of minor characters, expecting that they be expanded in future films about Detective Conan.

The Yahoo! Japan review gave a mixed 3.67 star based on opinions from critics.

Adaptation
The Scarlet Bullet will receive Manga Adaptation by Yutaka Abe and Jirō Maruden revealed in Shogakukan's Shonen Sunday S Magazine 2022 March Issue.

References

External links
  
 
 

2021 films
2021 anime films
Scarlet Bullet
TMS Entertainment
Toho animated films
Japanese crime films
Japanese action films
Japanese mystery films
IMAX films
Anime action films
Anime mystery films
Films set in Nagoya
Animated films set in Tokyo
Films set on trains
Films about kidnapping in Japan
Films postponed due to the COVID-19 pandemic